Frea aedificatoria is a species of beetle in the family Cerambycidae. It had been described by Hintz in 1910.

References

aedificatoria
Beetles described in 1910